Iridopsis perfectaria is a species of geometrid moth in the family Geometridae.

The MONA or Hodges number for Iridopsis perfectaria is 6581.

References

Further reading

 

Boarmiini
Articles created by Qbugbot
Moths described in 1940